The 1968 Maine Black Bears football team was an American football team that represented the University of Maine as a member of the Yankee Conference during the 1968 NCAA College Division football season. In its second season under head coach Walter Abbott, the team compiled a 3–5 record (2–3 against conference opponents) and finished in a three-way tie for third place in the Yankee Conference. Donald Loranger, Francis Griffin, and E. Quackenbush were the team captains.

Schedule

References

Maine
Maine Black Bears football seasons
Maine Black Bears football